Governor Wallace may refer to:

David Wallace (Indiana politician) (1799–1859), 6th Governor of Indiana
George Wallace (1919–1998), 45th Governor of Alabama
James Wallace (Royal Navy officer) (1731–1803), Commodore Governor of Newfoundland from 1794 to 1796
Jesse Wallace (1899–1961), 29th Governor of American Samoa
Lew Wallace (1827–1905), 11th Governor of New Mexico Territory
Lurleen Wallace (1926–1968), 46th Governor of Alabama
Reginald James Wallace (1919–2012), Governor of the Gilbert Islands from 1978 to 1979
William H. Wallace (1811–1879), 4th Governor of Washington Territory